Kantishna Airport  is a state-owned airstrip located two nautical miles (3.7 km) northwest of the former mining district of Kantishna in Denali National Park and Preserve, Alaska.

As per Federal Aviation Administration records, the airport had 985 passenger boardings (enplanements) in calendar year 2008. This airport is included in the FAA's National Plan of Integrated Airport Systems for 2009–2013, which categorizes it as a general aviation facility.

Facilities and aircraft 
It has one runway designated 10/28 with a gravel surface measuring 1,850 by 35 feet (564 x 11 m). For the 12-month period ending December 31, 2005, the airport had 1,200 aircraft operations, an average of 100 per month: 83% air taxi and 16% general aviation.

References

External links 
 FAA Alaska airport diagram (GIF)

Airports in Denali Borough, Alaska